Reyna Rueda Alvarado (born ) is a Nicaraguan politician. A member of the Sandinista National Liberation Front (FSLN), she has served as mayor of Managua since 2018.

Early life 
Rueda studied business administration at the Central American University (UCA).

Career 
Rueda was serving as a member of the Managua city council as of 2017. She was elected mayor on 5 November of that year with 87.64% of the vote, and sworn into office on 4 January 2018, to serve a four-year term. She succeeded Daysi Torres.

On a 2019 visit to Miami, Rueda faced protests and calls for the United States government to revoke her visa, arguing she was complicit in alleged human rights violations by the FSLN government. Domestically, she faced criticism for her travel after billing the city of Managua 2.3 million córdobas (about $65,000 USD) for airplane tickets to 23 countries. As of 2017, the annual budget for the city was 5.19 million córdobas.

Personal life
Rueda was married to Guillermo Nicolás Carmona Pineda, a lieutenant colonel in the Nicaraguan Army, until his death on 29 October 2020. They have two children.

References

Year of birth missing (living people)
21st-century Nicaraguan women politicians
21st-century Nicaraguan politicians
Sandinista National Liberation Front politicians
Living people
Mayors of Managua
Central American University (Managua) alumni